Pointe du Lac is a station on line 8 of the Paris Métro in the commune of Créteil. It is the eastern terminus of the line and is elevated.

History 
It opened on 8 October 2011 after a 1.3 km extension from Créteil–Préfecture, with construction having started in 2007. It is the easternmost and southernmost station on the Paris Métro system (not including stations on RER lines). It is situated to the southeast of Lac de Créteil.

In 2019, the station was used by 2,849,288 passengers making it the 186th busiest of the Métro network, out of 302 stations.

In 2020, the station was used by 1,684,557 passengers amidst the COVID-19 pandemic, making it the 150th busiest of the Métro network, out of 305 stations.

Passenger services

Access 
The station has a single entrance along a bus-only lane.

Station layout

Platforms 
Pointe du Lac is an elevated station with a particular arrangement specific to the stations serving or had served as a terminus. It has three tracks and two platforms. The side platform serves as the arrival platform while the island platform serves as the departure platform for services towards Balard. The arrival platform, due to it being the terminus of the line, does not have an awning over it, a unique case for an elevated station on the network. Orange “Akiko” style seats are installed on the island departure platform.

Other connections 
The station is also served by lines 117 and 393 of the RATP bus network, by line K of the STRAV bus network, and by line 23 of the SETRA bus network.

Gallery

References 

Paris Métro stations in Créteil
Paris Métro line 8
Railway stations in France opened in 2011